Rufus Washington Ewing (born 1968) is a Turks and Caicos Islander politician and medical doctor who served as the 3rd Premier of the Turks and Caicos Islands from 13 November 2012 to 20 December 2016. He was elected Premier of the Turks and Caicos Islands in the 2012 general election. He was the islands' first premier since the government of the United Kingdom suspended the office in 2009, temporarily imposing direct rule under the office of the Governor of the Turks and Caicos Islands, due to corruption allegations against the government of Michael Misick.

References

External links

|-

1972 births
Living people
Premiers of the Turks and Caicos Islands
Progressive National Party (Turks and Caicos Islands) politicians
Turks and Caicos Islands Christians
University of the West Indies alumni